Falling is the sixth studio album by Praga Khan and is the soundtrack to the Belgian film Falling. It was released in 2001.

Track listing
 "Falling" – 4:22	
 "Stranger in Lamastre" – 5:22	
 "Don't Wanna Loose You" – 5:12	
 "Staying" – 2:09	
 "Stargirl" – 4:00	
 "Guilt" – 3:29	
 "Sin" – 7:35	
 "Killing Time" – 3:16	
 "Choose Your Moment" – 4:30	
 "Reflections" – 3:51	
 "The Real Gun" – 1:44	
 "Rhythm" – 3:45

References

2001 soundtrack albums
Praga Khan albums
Film soundtracks